Edmund Hearne (September 17, 1887 – September 8, 1952) was a shortstop in Major League Baseball. Hearn batted and threw right-handed. He was born in Ventura, California.

He was hitless in two at-bats appearances. Following his playing career, he worked as a guard at the Veterans Affairs Complex in Los Angeles.

Hearne died in Sawtelle, California, at the age of 64.

Sources

Boston Red Sox players
Major League Baseball shortstops
People from Greater Los Angeles
Baseball players from California
1887 births
1952 deaths
Vernon Tigers players